Edwin J. "Jerry" Wilburn (born September 18, 1940) is an American politician in the state of Mississippi. He served in the Mississippi House of Representatives from 1964 to 1980. He is an alumnus of Itawamba Community College.

References

1940 births
Living people
People from Itawamba County, Mississippi
Itawamba Community College alumni
Businesspeople from Mississippi
Farmers from Mississippi
Members of the Mississippi House of Representatives